is a district located in Saga Prefecture, Japan.

In February 2009, the district had an estimated population of 54,233 and a density of 625 per km2. The total area is 86.82 km2.

Municipalities
Kamimine
Kiyama
Miyaki

History
Miyaki District consists of three former districts of Hizen Province: Kii, Mine and Yabu Districts.

Districts in Saga Prefecture